Zhao Xiaoli (born 1975 in Luzhou) is a Chinese Sichuan opera actress.

In 2019, she won the Asian New Talent: Best Actress award at the 22nd Shanghai International Film Festival and was nominated at 32nd Golden Rooster Awards for Best Actress for her performance in the film To Live to Sing directed by Johnny Ma.

Filmography 
To Live to Sing (2019)

Awards and nominations

References

External links

Zhao Xiaoli on Douban 

Living people
21st-century Chinese actresses
20th-century Chinese actresses
Chinese film actresses
20th-century Chinese women singers
21st-century Chinese women singers
Sichuan opera actresses
People from Luzhou
Actresses from Sichuan
Singers from Sichuan
1975 births